Josep Puig i Cadafalch (Mataró, 17 October 1867 – Barcelona, 21 December 1956) was a Catalan Modernista architect who designed many significant buildings in Barcelona, and a politician who had a significant role in the development of Catalan institutions. He was the architect of the Casa Martí (also known as "Els Quatre Gats"), which became a place of ideas, projects and social gatherings for such well-known Catalans as Santiago Rusiñol and Ramon Casas.

Although Puig's style separated him significantly from his contemporary Gaudí, their relations were neither tense nor problematic, as demonstrated by the participation of both architects in the construction of the Cafe Torino. Another of his significant buildings was the Casa Terrades (also known as "les Punxes"), which is known for its medieval castle style from the north of Europe.

Puig was actively involved in politics. He was a Barcelona City Councillor from 1901 to 1903, served in the Spanish Parliament from 1907 to 1910 and was the second president of the Commonwealth of Catalonia from 1917 to 1924. From 1942 to his death in 1956, he was the president of the academic institution of the Catalan language, the Institut d'Estudis Catalans.

He was also a great defender of Catalan culture and history which he hoped to see fully restored. He published studies of language, legal order and political organisation in the 11th-12th centuries. Amongst his important legacies is also the documentation and photographing of the culturally important buildings and art works the Vall d'Aran and Alta Ribagorça (including the Catalan Romanesque Churches of the Vall de Boí) during an expedition sponsored by the Institute for Catalan Studies in 1907.

Main works

Andorra

Argentona

Barcelona

Canet de Mar

Esplugues de Llobregat

La Garriga

Lloret de Mar

Massanes

Mataró

Monistrol de Montserrat

el Prat de Llobregat

Sant Fruitós de Bages

Sant Quirze Safaja

Sant Sadurní d'Anoia

Seva

Tàrrega

Viladrau

Viladecans

References

Bibliography

External links

 Chronology of Catalan architecture and biographies of Catalan architects, from the gothic master builders to contemporary architecture, including Josep Puig i Cadafalch

1867 births
1956 deaths
People from Mataró
Architects from Catalonia
19th-century Spanish architects
Modernisme architects
Members of the Institute for Catalan Studies
Corresponding Fellows of the Medieval Academy of America
20th-century Spanish architects